David Dvořák (born June 5, 1992) is a Czech mixed martial artist. A professional since 2010, he currently competes in the Flyweight division in the Ultimate Fighting Championship (UFC). As of December 19, 2022, he is #10 in the UFC flyweight rankings.

Background 
During his professional career in combat sports, he graduated in 2015 with a Bachelor's degree in Sports Management from the University of Hradec Kralove. In addition to his studies, he had to combine training with his job to earn a living and prepare for fights. For three years he worked as a construction engineer in highway construction and for five years he worked as a gravedigger, following his father's example. His past as a gravedigger is reflected in his nickname "Undertaker".

In his spare time, he enjoys recreational shooting, chess, gardening, and animals. He has had a positive relationship with the latter since childhood, having grown up on a farm surrounded by farm animals. He now keeps a domestic cat of the Sphynx breed. Before combat sports, he played competitive chess, in which he competed in the junior chess league until the age of seventeen.

Mixed martial arts career

Early career
He started with MMA in 2009 in Valetudo club in Hradec Králové. He had his first professional fight at the age of 18 in 2010, when he lost on points to Filip Mack. Dvořák would then compile a 17-3 record fighting across various Czech regional promotions. Now he trains in clubs TopAtlet and All Sports Academy. His main coaches are Patrik Kincl, Jan Maršálek and Lukáš Chotěnovský. Apart from domestic clubs, he has also gained experience abroad. He has attended training camps in London, Poland, and Thailand, where he spent six months training with clubs such as Team Quest, Phuket Top Team and Tiger Muay Thai.

XFN
Dvořák made his debut with the Czech-based XFN at XFN 5 on October 21, 2017, when he was booked to face Miroslav Kubáň. He won the fight by a second-round technical knockout.

Dvořák made three more appearances with XFN. Dvořák first faced Marco Manovali at XFN 8 on March 3, 2018. He won the fight by a first-round technical knockout. Dvořák next faced Salambek Damaev at XFN 13 on November 10, 2018. He won the fight by a second-round submission. Dvořák faced Zaka Fatullazade at XFN 15 on December 27, 2018, in his fourth and final appearance with the promotion. He won the fight by a first-round technical knockout.

Dvořák  faced Arsen Taigibov at Oktagon 13 on July 27, 2019. He won the fight by a second-round submission.

Ultimate Fighting Championship
He signed a contract with the UFC in 2020, becoming the fourth Czech to achieve such a feat. He accepted the offer with only five weeks' notice before the UFC Fight Night: Lee vs. Oliveira event in Brazil on March 14, 2020, where he replaced fighter Su Mudaerji. In his debut bout, he faced Bruno Gustavo da Silva, whom he defeated on points after three rounds.

At the UFC Fight Night: Covington vs. Woodley event held in Las Vegas on September 19, 2020, he faced Jordan Espinosa, who was ranked 13th in the flyweight rankings before the fight. Dvořák defeated his better-ranked opponent on points by unanimous decision, extending his unbeaten streak to 15 fights.

Dvořák was scheduled to face Raulian Paiva on May 22, 2021 at the UFC Fight Night: Font vs. Garbrandt event. However, Paiva pulled out of the fight the day before the event due to ill effects related to his weight cut. He was replaced by promotional newcomer Juancamilo Ronderos. At the weigh-ins, Ronderos weighed in at 128.5 pounds, two and a half pounds over the division's non-title fight limit. The bout proceeded at catchweight and he was fined 20% of his purse, which went to Dvořák. Dvořák won the fight via a rear-naked choke submission in the first round.

Dvořák faced Matheus Nicolau on March 26, 2022 at UFC on ESPN 33. He lost the fight by unanimous decision.

Dvořák faced Manel Kape on December 17, 2022 at UFC Fight Night 216. He lost the fight via unanimous decision.

Championships and accomplishments 
Gladiator Championship Fighting
GCF Flyweight Championship (One time)

Mixed martial arts record

|-
|Loss
|align=center|20–5
|Manel Kape
|Decision (unanimous)
|UFC Fight Night: Cannonier vs. Strickland
| 
|align=center|3
|align=center|5:00
|Las Vegas, Nevada, United States
|
|-
|Loss
|align=center|20–4
|Matheus Nicolau
|Decision (unanimous)
|UFC on ESPN: Blaydes vs. Daukaus
|
|align=center|3
|align=center|5:00
|Columbus, Ohio, United States
|
|-
|Win
|align=center|20–3
|Juancamilo Ronderos
|Submission (rear-naked choke)
|UFC Fight Night: Font vs. Garbrandt
|
|align=center|1
|align=center|2:43
|Las Vegas, Nevada, United States
|
|-
| Win
| align=center|19–3
| Jordan Espinosa
|Decision (unanimous)
|UFC Fight Night: Covington vs. Woodley
|
|align=center|3
|align=center|5:00
|Las Vegas, Nevada, United States
|
|-
| Win
| align=center|18–3
| Bruno Gustavo da Silva
| Decision (unanimous)
|UFC Fight Night: Lee vs. Oliveira
|
|align=center|3
|align=center|5:00
|Brasília, Brazil
|
|-
| Win
| align=center|17–3
| Arsen Taigibov
| Submission (rear-naked choke)
| Oktagon 13
| 
| align=center|2
| align=center|4:02
| Prague, Czech Republic
|
|-
| Win
| align=center| 16–3
|Igor Goncharov
| TKO (punches)
| Night of Warriors 15
| 
| align=center|1
| align=center|3:10
| Liberec, Czech Republic
|
|-
| Win
| align=center| 15–3
| Zaka Fatullazade	
| TKO (punches)
|XFN 15
|
|align=center|1
|align=center|2:26
|Prague, Czech Republic
|
|-
| Win
| align=center| 14–3
| Salambek Damaev
|Submission (rear-naked choke)
|XFN 13
|
|align=center|2
|align=center|2:10
|Pardubice, Czech Republic
|
|-
| Win
| align=center| 13–3
| Marco Manovali
| TKO (punches and elbows)
| XFN 8
| 
| align=center| 1
| align=center| 3:56
| Pardubice, Czech Republic
| 
|-
| Win
| align=center| 12–3
| Miroslav Kubáň
| TKO (punches)
| XFN 5
| 
| align=center| 2
| align=center| 3:58
| Pardubice, Czech Republic
|
|-
| Win
| align=center| 11–3
| Shely Santana
| Submission (rear-naked choke)
| Night of Masters 11
| 
| align=center| 1
| align=center| 4:30
| Prague, Czech Republic
| 
|-
| Win
| align=center| 10–3
| Miroslav Kubáň
| TKO (doctor stoppage)
| Fight Nights Global 49
| 
| align=center| 2
| align=center| 2:41
| Banská Bystrica, Slovakia
|
|-
| Win
| align=center|9–3
| Tomáš Žák
| TKO (punches)
| GCF 31
| 
| align=center| 1
| align=center| 1:03
| Brno, Czech Republic
|
|-
| Win
| align=center|8–3
| Martin Fexa
| Submission (rear-naked choke)
| GCF 30
| 
| align=center|1
| align=center|4:19
| Prague, Czech Republic
|
|-
| Win
| align=center|7–3
| Kamil Wójcik
| Submission (armbar)
| GCF 29
| 
| align=center|1
| align=center|4:25
| Mladá Boleslav, Czech Republic
|
|-
| Win
| align=center|6–3
| Petr Neumann
| TKO 
| GCF Challenge: Eastern Best 3
| 
| align=center|1
| align=center|N/A
| Pardubice, Czech Republic
|
|-
| Win
| align=center|5–3
| Ondrej Skalnik
| Submission (rear-naked choke)
| GCF 16
| 
| align=center|1
| align=center|2:30
| Pardubice, Czech Republic
|
|-
| Loss
| align=center| 4–3
| Filip Macek
| TKO (cut)
| GCF 12
| 
| align=center|2
| align=center|0:15
| Brno, Czech Republic
| 
|-
| Win
| align=center| 4–2
| Artur Jevsejčik
| Decision (unanimous)
| GCF 9
| 
| align=center| 3
| align=center| 5:00
|Ostrava, Czech Republic
| 
|-
| Win
| align=center| 3–2
| Michal Malata
| Submission (heel hook)
| Fighters Fight Night
| 
| align=center| 2
| align=center| 1:13
| Pardubice, Czech Republic
| 
|-
| Loss
| align=center| 2–2
| Leszek Kulik
| Decision (unanimous)
| Heroes Gate 4
| 
| align=center| 3
| align=center| 5:00
|Prague, Czech Republic
| 
|-
| Win
| align=center| 2–1
| Tomas Masojidek
| TKO (punches)
| GCF 3
| 
| align=center| 2
| align=center| 2:03
| Říčany, Czech Republic
| 
|-
| Win
| align=center| 1–1
| Petr Neuman
| Decision (unanimous)
| GCF 1
| 
| align=center| 3
| align=center| 3:00
| Prague, Czech Republic
|
|-
| Loss
| align=center| 0–1
| Filip Macek
| Decision (unanimous)
|Nord Bohemia Ring
| 
| align=center| 2
| align=center| 5:00
| Ústí nad Labem, Czech Republic
|

See also 
 List of current UFC fighters
 List of male mixed martial artists

References

External links 
  
 

1992 births
Living people
Czech male mixed martial artists
Flyweight mixed martial artists
People from Hořice
Ultimate Fighting Championship male fighters
Sportspeople from the Hradec Králové Region